Laverlochère-Angliers is a municipality in northwestern Quebec, Canada, in the Témiscamingue Regional County Municipality. It was incorporated as a municipality on January 1, 2018, through the amalgamation of the Municipality of Laverlochère and the Village of Angliers.

Demographics 

In the 2016 Census of Population conducted by Statistics Canada, the former Village of Angliers recorded a population of 303 living in 139 of its 218 total private dwellings, a  change from its 2011 population of 298.

Also in 2016, the former Municipality of Laverlochère recorded a population of 675 living in 289 of its 321 total private dwellings, a  change from its 2011 population of 731.

Combined, the amalgamated Municipality of Laverlochère-Angliers therefore had a population of 978 living in 428 of its 539 total private dwellings in 2016, a  change from its 2011 population of 1,029.

See also 
 List of municipalities in Quebec
 Jean-Nicolas Laverlochère

External links

References 

Municipalities in Quebec
Incorporated places in Abitibi-Témiscamingue